The Manitoba Liberal Party ran a full slate of 57 candidates in the 1988 provincial election, and elected twenty Members of the Legislative Assembly to become the Official Opposition party.

Several of the party's candidates have their own biography pages.  Information about others may be found on this page.

Barbara Blomeley (Concordia)
Blomeley received 2,948 votes (30.03%), finishing second against New Democratic Party leader Gary Doer.

Chris Sigurdson (Riel)
Sigurdson contested Riel as the Liberal candidate in the 1986 Manitoba provincial elections as well as 1988. In 2010 he was elected as a School trustee in the Louis Riel School Division. He was re-elected in 2014 and 2018 and served as Board Chair from 2014-2018. He works as a Criminal Defense Lawyer.

References

1988